Stardust Five is the self-titled debut album by Stardust Five which was released in 2006.  The album was mixed and produced by Tchad Blake (Crowded House, Bernard Fanning).

It was released on EMI Music in Australia and Capitol Records in the United States. The first single "Pussy Got Your Tongue" features vocals from Loene Carmen, a singer/songwriter/actress, who has released two solo albums and has collaborated with the likes of the Dirty Three and The Mess Hall. The title of the song was originally the title of a short film by Tania Lacy that was shown at Tropfest in 1997. Lacy also co-wrote the song with the band. Sian Prior who provides additional vocals on "Zoe" and "Los Cucumbros" was also Paul Kelly's then-girlfriend.

Track listing 
All tracks written by Paul Kelly, Dan Kelly, Dan Luscombe, Peter Luscombe and Bill MacDonald except where noted.
 "Last Orders" (instrumental) – 4:20
 "Nightwatchman" – 4:51
 "Things We Said in the Dark" – 2:26
 "Pussy Got Your Tongue" (featuring Loene Carmen) (Tania Lacy, Paul Kelly, Dan Kelly, Dan Luscombe, Peter Luscombe) – 2:46
 "Mi Camion Mi Casa" – 3:35
 "Everybody Loves You Baby" – 3:13
 "Zoe" – 2:27 
 "Road to the North" (Paul Kelly, Dan Luscombe, Peter Luscombe, Bill MacDonald) – 3:18
 "Lady with Dog" – 3:42
 "Lovers' Field" – 5:25
 "Los Cucumbros" – 3:20

Personnel

Musicians
Credits:
 Loene Carmen — vocals (track 4)
 Ken Gardiner — trumpet (track 5)
 Paul Kelly — vocals/guitars
 Dan Kelly — guitars/vocals 
 Peter Luscombe — drums 
 Dan Luscombe — guitars/keyboards 
 Bill McDonald — bass
 Sian Prior — vocals (tracks 7 & 11)

Production
 Producer, Sound Mix — Tchad Blake
 Engineer — Daniel Rejmer
 Assistant Engineer — Aaron Cupples

References

Releases

2006 debut albums
Albums produced by Tchad Blake
Paul Kelly (Australian musician) albums
EMI Records albums
Capitol Records albums